Rohit Heero Motwani (born 13 December 1990) is an Indian cricketer. He is a wicketkeeper-batsman who plays in the Indian domestic cricket for Maharashtra.

He was included in the India A squad to play the warm-up one-day match against England on 6 January 2013.

He was the leading run-scorer for Maharashtra in the 2017–18 Ranji Trophy, with 460 runs in five matches.

References

External links 

1990 births
Living people
Cricketers from Pune
Indian cricketers
Maharashtra cricketers
West Zone cricketers
Wicket-keepers